Settle is an unincorporated community in Allen County, Kentucky, United States. Big Spring School-Oliver Farmstead, which is listed on the National Register of Historic Places, is located in Settle.

References

Unincorporated communities in Allen County, Kentucky
Unincorporated communities in Kentucky